Misty is an album by saxophonist Eddie "Lockjaw" Davis with organist Shirley Scott recorded in 1960 and released on the Moodsville label in 1963.

Reception

Allmusic awarded the album three stars.

Track listing 
 "Oh-Oh" (Don Elliott, Alexander Burland) - 2:25   
 "Misty" (Erroll Garner, Johnny Burke) - 3:48  
 "Give Me a Kiss Goodnight" (Lee Morse) - 5:40
 "The Moon of Manakoora" (Frank Loesser, Alfred Newman) - 7:02  
 "Just Friends" (John Klenner, Sam M. Lewis) - 6:15 
 "Speak Low" (Ogden Nash, Kurt Weill) - 6:51
 "I Wished on the Moon" (Dorothy Parker, Ralph Rainger) - 5:00

Personnel 
Eddie "Lockjaw" Davis - tenor saxophone
 Shirley Scott - organ
 George Duvivier (tracks 1 & 2), Wendell Marshall (tracks 3-7) - bass
 Arthur Edgehill - drums
 Ray Barretto - congas (tracks 2, 3 & 5-7)

References 

Eddie "Lockjaw" Davis albums
1963 albums
Albums produced by Esmond Edwards
Albums recorded at Van Gelder Studio
Moodsville Records albums
Shirley Scott albums